Hyposmocoma inversella is a species of moth of the family Cosmopterigidae. It was first described by Lord Walsingham in 1907. It is endemic to the Hawaiian island of Oahu.

The length of the forewings is 4.9 mm for males and 4.7 mm for females. Adults have a large, orange, V-shaped marking on the forewing found in no other described species of Hyposmocoma. Adult emergence occurs between March and April. There is probably one generation per year.

The larval case is dark brown, smooth, 7.8–8.5 mm in length and 1.8–2 mm wide. Case-making larvae were collected in December and January. Larvae were found in leaf litter and on rotting logs.

References

External links

Inversella
Endemic moths of Hawaii
Moths described in 1907
Taxa named by Thomas de Grey, 6th Baron Walsingham